Maxine Baker is the name of:
Maxine B. Baker (born 1952), American businesswoman
Maxine Baker (politician) (1898–1994), American politician
Maxine Baker, character in The Children's Crusade